The Sangria 25 is a French sailboat that was designed by Philippe Harlé as a cruiser-racer and first built in 1969.

The design is one of the most successful sailboat models of its size built in Europe, with 2,336 boats completed.

Production
The design was built by Jeanneau and Gibert Marine in France from 1969 until 1982, but it is now out of production. A total of 2,150 standard models were built plus 186 of the GTE model.

Design
The Sangria 25 is a recreational keelboat, built predominantly of single skin fiberglass polyester, with wooden trim. It has a masthead sloop rig, with a deck-stepped mast, one set of spreaders and aluminum spars with stainless steel wire rigging. The hull has a raked stem, a  plumb transom, a skeg-mounted rudder controlled by a tiller and a fixed fin keel or deep draft keel in the GTE model. It displaces  and carries  of ballast.

The design has sleeping accommodation for four people, with a double "V"-berth in the bow cabin and two straight settee berths in the main cabin. The galley is located on the starboard side just forward of the companionway ladder. The galley is equipped with a two-burner stove, ice box and a small sink. The head is located just aft of the bow cabin on the port side.

Operational history
The boat is supported by an active class club, Les Amis du Sangria et l'Aquila.

See also
List of sailing boat types

References

External links

Keelboats
1960s sailboat type designs
Sailing yachts
Sailboat type designs by Philippe Harlé
Sailboat types built by Jeanneau
Sailboat types built by Gibert Marine